Mandy Nga-man Chiang is a Hong Kong singer formerly signed to the Emperor Entertainment Group's Music Icon Records. Her music career first began in 2002 when she was partnered with Yumiko Cheng (鄭希怡) and Maggie Lau (劉思惠) to form the female group 3T. The group released one EP (少女蝶) and separated shortly after. Then, in 2005, Mandy's music career began again when she was asked to form a musical dua with Don Li, and together, they released three albums. In January 2007, Chiang announced that she and Li would continue their music careers as solo artists. Her debut solo album was released on 24 April 2007, titled Other Half. She also appeared in several movies and TV series. Today, she is the owner of a café and clothing store in Taipei, Taiwan, where she now resides.

Filmography
 The Twins Effect (2003)
 Anna in Kung-Fu Land (2003)
 New Police Story (2004)
 Yarudora (2005)
 Rob-B-Hood (2006)
 Luxury Fantasy (2007)
 Whispers and Moans (2007)
 A Mob Story (2007)
 The Sparkle in the Dark (2008)
 Yes, I Can See Dead People (2008)
 A Decade of Love (2008)

Discography
3T – Butterfly (2003)
Don & Mandy (2005)
Don & Mandy – Rainy Lover (2006)
Don & Mandy – Winter Lover (2006)
Mandy Chiang – Other Half (2007)
Mandy Chiang – Winter Story (2007)

Television Series
 All About Boy'z (2002)
 The Vigilante in the Mask (2004)
 Kung Fu Soccer'' (2005)

References

External links
 Her Personal Xanga
 
 HK cinemagic entry
 loveHKfilm entry

1982 births
Living people
Cantopop singers
Hong Kong film actresses
Hong Kong Mandopop singers
Hong Kong television actresses
21st-century Hong Kong actresses
21st-century Hong Kong women singers
Hong Kong idols